Daniil Nikolayevich Chalov (born 17 June 1994) is a Russian football defender.

Club career
He made his professional debut in the Russian Football National League for FC SKA-Energiya Khabarovsk on 6 July 2014 in a game against FC Luch-Energiya Vladivostok.

After his spell in Belarus, his next destination was Serbia, where he signed on January 28, 2021 a 2-years contract with FK Inđija.

Personal life
He is the older brother of Fyodor Chalov.

References

External links

1993 births
Footballers from Moscow
Living people
Russian footballers
Russia under-21 international footballers
Association football midfielders
FC Lokomotiv Moscow players
FC SKA-Khabarovsk players
FC Tom Tomsk players
FC Mordovia Saransk players
FC Shinnik Yaroslavl players
FC Vitebsk players
FK Inđija players
Russian First League players
Belarusian Premier League players
Serbian SuperLiga players
Russian expatriate footballers
Expatriate footballers in Belarus
Expatriate footballers in Serbia
Russian expatriate sportspeople in Belarus
Russian expatriate sportspeople in Serbia